Carlos Brown may refer to:

Carlos Brown (American football) (born 1988), Michigan Wolverine running back
Carlos Brown (footballer) (1882–1926), Argentine footballer
Carlinhos Brown (born 1962), Brazilian musician
Carlitos Brown, the Spanish name of Charlie Brown
Alan Autry (born 1952), American actor, politician, and National Football League player

See also
Charles Brown (disambiguation)